Göynük is a town in the District of Kemer, Antalya Province, Turkey.

See also
 Göynük Canyon

References

Populated places in Antalya Province
Kemer District
Towns in Turkey